Decaryella is a genus of plants in the grass family. The only known species is Decaryella madagascariensis, native to Madagascar.

References

Chloridoideae
Endemic flora of Madagascar
Monotypic Poaceae genera
Taxa named by Aimée Antoinette Camus